Acontias albigularis, the white-throated legless skink, is a species of lizard in the family Scincidae. It is endemic to South Africa.

References

Acontias
Skinks of Africa
Endemic reptiles of South Africa
Reptiles described in 2018
Taxa named by Werner Conradie
Taxa named by Shelley Edwards